Félix Mathaus Lima Santos (born 28 November 1990) is a Cape Verdean professional footballer who plays as a centre-back for Liga I club Petrolul Ploiești.

Career
Born on the island of Boa Vista in Cape Verde, Félix Mathaus signed with Portuguese club Tourizense at a young age, and progressed quickly through the team's youth ranks. He was promoted to the senior team in 2013, who was playing in the third-tier Campeonato de Portugal at the time. Over the next two seasons, he made 28 league appearances, scoring one goal.

In July 2015, he signed a one-year contract with second-tier club Académico Viseu. He then made his professional debut on 6 September by playing a full 90 minutes in a 1–0 win against Santa Clara, and scored his first professional goal on 24 October against Varzim.

References

External links
 
 SoccerPunter profile
 

Living people
People from Boa Vista, Cape Verde
1995 births
Cape Verdean footballers
Cape Verdean expatriate footballers
Association football defenders
G.D. Tourizense players
Académico de Viseu F.C. players
G.D. Chaves players
U.D. Oliveirense players
Liga Portugal 2 players
Primeira Liga players
Expatriate footballers in Portugal
Cape Verdean expatriate sportspeople in Portugal
Liga I players
CS Gaz Metan Mediaș players
FC Petrolul Ploiești players
Expatriate footballers in Romania
Cape Verdean expatriate sportspeople in Romania